Llordà is a hamlet located in the municipality of Isona i Conca Dellà, in Province of Lleida province, Catalonia, Spain. As of 2020, it has a population of 5.

Geography 
Llordà is located 92km northeast of Lleida.

References

Populated places in the Province of Lleida